The World University Golf Championship is a competition sponsored by the International University Sports Federation (FISU), which was first held in October 1986 at the Molas Golf Club in Cagliari, Italy.

Competitions

See also
 Golf at the Summer Universiade

References

External links
 FISU

Golf
University